Kõpu River is a river in Viljandi County, Estonia. The river is 75.2 km long and basin size is 399.2 km2. It runs into Raudna River.

References

Rivers of Estonia
Viljandi County